The 97th New York State Legislature, consisting of the New York State Senate and the New York State Assembly, met from January 6 to April 30, 1874, during the second year of John A. Dix's governorship, in Albany.

Background
Under the provisions of the New York Constitution of 1846, 32 Senators and 128 assemblymen were elected in single-seat districts; senators for a two-year term, assemblymen for a one-year term. The senatorial districts were made up of entire counties, except New York County (five districts) and Kings County (two districts). The Assembly districts were made up of entire towns, or city wards, forming a contiguous area, all within the same county.

At this time there were two major political parties: the Republican Party and the Democratic Party. The Liberal Republican Party also nominated a ticket.

Elections
The New York state election, 1873 was held on November 4. The statewide elective offices up for election were carried by five Democrats and two Republicans, all of which had been nominated also on the Liberal Republican ticket.

Sessions
The Legislature met for the regular session at the Old State Capitol in Albany on January 6, 1874; and adjourned on April 30.

James W. Husted (R) was elected Speaker against Smith M. Weed (D).

On April 7, the Legislature elected Neil Gilmour as Superintendent of Public Instructions, with 87 votes against 51 for Abram B. Weaver, to succeed Weaver for a term of three years.

State Senate

Districts

 1st District: Queens, Richmond and Suffolk counties
 2nd District: 1st, 2nd, 3rd, 4th, 5th, 7th, 11th, 13th, 15th, 19th and 20th wards of the City of Brooklyn
 3rd District: 6th, 8th, 9th, 10th, 12th, 14th, 16th, 17th and 18th wards of the City of Brooklyn; and all towns in Kings County
 4th District: 1st, 2nd, 3rd, 4th, 5th, 6th, 7th, 13th and 14th wards of New York City
 5th District: 8th, 9th, 15th and 16th wards of New York City
 6th District: 10th, 11th and 17th wards of New York City
 7th District: 18th, 20th and 21st wards of New York City
 8th District: 12th, 19th and 22nd wards of New York City
 9th District: Putnam, Rockland and Westchester counties
 10th District: Orange and Sullivan counties
 11th District: Columbia and Dutchess counties
 12th District: Rensselaer and Washington counties
 13th District: Albany County
 14th District: Greene and Ulster counties
 15th District: Fulton, Hamilton, Montgomery, Saratoga and Schenectady counties
 16th District: Clinton, Essex and Warren counties
 17th District: Franklin and St. Lawrence counties
 18th District: Jefferson and Lewis counties
 19th District: Oneida County
 20th District: Herkimer and Otsego counties
 21st District: Madison and Oswego counties
 22nd District: Onondaga and Cortland counties
 23rd District: Chenango, Delaware and Schoharie counties
 24th District: Broome, Tompkins and Tioga counties
 25th District: Cayuga and Wayne counties
 26th District: Ontario, Seneca and Yates counties
 27th District: Chemung, Schuyler and Steuben counties
 28th District: Monroe County
 29th District: Genesee, Niagara and Orleans counties
 30th District: Allegany, Livingston and Wyoming counties
 31st District: Erie County
 32nd District: Cattaraugus and Chautauqua counties

Note: There are now 62 counties in the State of New York. The counties which are not mentioned in this list had not yet been established, or sufficiently organized, the area being included in one or more of the abovementioned counties.

Members
The asterisk (*) denotes members of the previous Legislature who continued in office as members of this Legislature. John C. Jacobs, Frank Abbott, Benjamin Ray and Franklin W. Tobey changed from the Assembly to the Senate.

Employees
 Clerk: Henry A. Glidden
 Sergeant-at-Arms: Daniel K. Schram
 Doorkeeper: Frederick M. Burton

State Assembly

Assemblymen
The asterisk (*) denotes members of the previous Legislature who continued as members of this Legislature.

Employees
 Clerk: John O'Donnell
 Sergeant-at-Arms: Frederick C. Fiske
Assistant Sergeant-at-Arms: DeWitt Griffin
 Doorkeeper: Eugene L. Demers
 Assistant Doorkeeper: James Hogan
 Assistant Doorkeeper: Michael Maher
 Stenographer: Worden E. Payne

Notes

Sources
 Civil List and Constitutional History of the Colony and State of New York compiled by Edgar Albert Werner (1884; see pg. 276 for Senate districts; pg. 290 for senators; pg. 298–304 for Assembly districts; and pg. 374f for assemblymen)
 Journal of the Senate (97th Session) (1874)
 REPUBLICAN ASSEMBLY CAUCUSES in NYT on January 6, 1874
 THE STATE GOVERNMENT in The Newtown Register on January 15, 1874
 Life Sketches of Government Officers and Members of the Legislature of the State of New York in 1874 by W. H. McElroy and Alexander McBride

097
1874 in New York (state)
1874 U.S. legislative sessions